Riccardo Martinelli (born 30 April 1991) is an Italian professional footballer who plays as a defender for  club Pontedera.

Club career
He played the first ten seasons of his senior career in the lower-tier Serie C and Serie D.

He made his Serie B debut for Reggiana on 27 September 2020 in a game against Pisa, as a starter, and scored a goal in that game.

On 30 August 2021 he signed with Viterbese.

On 31 August 2022, Martinelli moved to Pontedera.

References

External links
 

1991 births
Living people
Sportspeople from Arezzo
Footballers from Tuscany
Italian footballers
Association football defenders
Serie B players
Serie C players
Serie D players
A.C. Cesena players
A.C. Bellaria Igea Marina players
Rimini F.C. 1912 players
A.C. Prato players
S.S.D. Lucchese 1905 players
A.C. Reggiana 1919 players
U.S. Viterbese 1908 players
U.S. Città di Pontedera players